Travis Miller (born May 13, 1984) is an American rapper, singer and record producer from Richmond, Virginia. He has recorded under multiple aliases in various genres since his first known released project in 2005, including Lil Ugly Mane, Shawn Kemp, Vudmurk and Bedwetter.

Miller rose to popularity in the early 2010s with an experimental approach to Southern hip hop. His debut album Mista Thug Isolation gained him notoriety in the underground hip hop scene. Since then, he has experimented with a number of styles within and outside the hip hop genre, most recently releasing the indie rock album Volcanic Bird Enemy and the Voiced Concern. His other work spans genres including instrumental and abstract hip hop, black metal, free jazz and noise music.

Career 
Miller began recording music in the 2000s under a number of aliases. Much of his early music cannot be found today on the internet, however some of it has been re-released, such as on his Register compilation album. Some of his early work included the black metal projects Vudmurk and Seidhr, the industrial and noise projects Across, Public Garden and Rats, and the underground hip hop group The Legacy, during which time he rapped under the name Young Gus.

Miller began releasing hip hop under the name Lil Ugly Mane on Bandcamp and producing beats for himself and other artists under the name Shawn Kemp in 2010, releasing his debut mixtape Playaz Circle in 2011. His early work under the Lil Ugly Mane name drew on various styles of underground Southern hip hop from the 1990s such as Memphis rap and chopped and screwed. His style was similar to that of the contemporaneous Raider Klan collective, with whom he collaborated. His 2012 debut album Mista Thug Isolation earned positive reviews from Mishka NYC, among others and support from members of the popular hip hop collective Odd Future. The album has since been hailed as a classic of the 2010s underground hip hop scene, earning later praise from Pitchfork and The Needle Drop. The album was followed by a number of smaller releases, including the Uneven Compromise EP, which is ranked in the top 10 greatest EPs of all time by user-generated music review site RateYourMusic, and the single "On Doing an Evil Deed Blues", in which he outlined his grievances with the music industry and his intention to retire the Lil Ugly Mane project.

Miller announced he would release one final album under the Lil Ugly Mane name, and began sporadically releasing compilations of beats and older material on Bandcamp, including the Three Sided Tape series, the final installment of which, Third Side of Tape, received positive coverage from Anthony Fantano of The Needle Drop among others. In 2015, Miller released what was intended to be the final Lil Ugly Mane album – Oblivion Access and the final Shawn Kemp project – Trick Dice, a collaboration with rapper Nickelus F. Oblivion Access saw Lil Ugly Mane taking a more experimental approach divorced from his earlier '90s Southern rap influences.

In 2017, Miller announced he would continue rapping under the name Bedwetter and released his debut project under the name – Volume 1: Flick Your Tongue Against Your Teeth and Describe the Present. The album continued with the more introspective and experimental style of Oblivion Access. Around the same time however, Miller began rapping under the Lil Ugly Mane name again as part of the group Secret Circle with Antwon and Wiki. After releasing a few singles, the group disbanded and scrapped their debut album due to a personal falling out. Miller began working with the remaining members of GothBoiClique, however then appeared to go on hiatus, only releasing small collections of older material sporadically.

In 2021, Miller began releasing new music under the Lil Ugly Mane name. He released the single "Headboard", followed by "Porcelain Slightly" and then his third major release under the Lil Ugly Mane name – Volcanic Bird Enemy and the Voiced Concern, which was covered positively by Sputnik Music and Stereogum. Around the same time, Miller released a new black metal demo under the Vudmurk name.

Partial discography

Studio albums 
Mista Thug Isolation (2012)
Trick Dice  (2015)
Oblivion Access (2015)
Volume 1: Flick Your Tongue Against Your Teeth and Describe the Present.  (2017)
Volcanic Bird Enemy and the Voiced Concern (2021)

Mixtapes 
Playaz Circle: Pre Meditation (the First Prophecy) Preview Mixtape (Real Murder Posse Underground Version) (2011)
Criminal Hypnosis: Unreleased Shit (2012)
Three Sided Tape Volume One (2013)
Three Sided Tape Volume Two (2013)
Absence of Shitperson (2014)
Third Side of Tape (2015)

Extended plays/demos 
Dey Bout 2 Find Yo Body (da Birth of a Murderah) Demo (2010)
 Softwehr  (2010)
 I Thought I Lost You  (2011)
 External Files  (2012)
Supasonic  (2012)
Uneven Compromise (2012)
Sleep Until It Hurts You  (2013)
The Weeping Worm (2014)
Thing s Thatare Stuff (2018)
Obedient Form  (2021)
I Believe the World Would Be a Better Place Without You (2022)

Singles 
"U Ain't From My Hood" (2011)
"Bust a Sag da Single" (2011)
Send Em 2 tha Essence (2012)
"Thug Isolation" (2012)
"Prelude to Panopticon: 'On Doing an Evil Deed Blues' Single" (2013)
Persistence (2015)
Grave Within a Grave (2015)
"Doing Badass Improvisational Stuff Rag for Piano"  (2018)
"Headboard" (2021)
"Porcelain Slightly"/"Into a Life" (2021)
"Headboard (Nineteen at the Wave Mix)" (2021)
"Low Tide at the Dryin' Out Facility" (2022)
"Christmas Cowboy"  (2022)
"Blue Sand" (2022)
"Pink & Rose" (2022)
"Easy Prey" (2022)
"Split Ends" (2022)
Redacted Fog (2022)
"ricochet" (2023)

Miscellaneous 
Turns Into  (2012)
Study of the Hypothesized Removable and/or Expandable Nature of Human Capability and Limitations Primarily Regarding Introductory Experiences with New and Exciting Technologies by Way of Motivational Incentive Volume One  (2012)
Study of the Hypothesized Removable and/or Expandable Nature of Human Capability and Limitations Primarily Regarding Introductory Experiences with New and Exciting Technologies by Way of Motivational Incentive Volume Two  (2012)
Entertaners Bluels For Once Micale Jackson Thriler  (2013)
Register  (2017)
Songs That People Emailed Me About Asking Why I Hadn't Put Them on Streaming Platforms  (2019)

Guest appearances

Guest production

References

External links
Lil Ugly Mane biography at AllMusic

1984 births
Alternative hip hop musicians
American graphic designers
American male rappers
Musicians from Richmond, Virginia
Rappers from Virginia
Underground rappers
Living people
21st-century American rappers
21st-century American male musicians